Shelmerdine is a surname. Notable people with the surname include:

Sir Francis Shelmerdine (1881-1945), British Royal Flying Corps officer and later Director-General of Civil Aviation
Cynthia W. Shelmerdine, American historian of the Mycenaean Bronze age.
Kirk Shelmerdine, American NASCAR driver
Neville Shelmerdine, English cricketer
Thomas Shelmerdine, English architect
Mark Shelmerdine, Australian Structural Engineer
Jovana Shelmerdine, Internationally exhibited and award-winning Serbian artist